Mekeo Kuni Rural LLG is a local-level government (LLG) of Central Province, Papua New Guinea.

Wards
01. Aipeana
02. Veifa'a
03. Rarai
04. Ianwaui
05. Eboa
06. Inawabui
07. Inawaia
08. Inaoae
09. Bebeo
10. Jeku
11. Inaui
12. Ameiaka
13. Babanongo
14. Maipa
15. Apanaipi
16. Upper Kuni
17. Lower Kuni
18. Kubuina
19. Bakoiudu

References

Local-level governments of Central Province (Papua New Guinea)